Alan Gold is the name of:
Alan Gold (author) (born 1945), author, literary critic and human rights activist
Alan B. Gold (1917–2005), former chief justice of the Quebec Superior Court
Alan Stephen Gold (born 1944), American lawyer and judge